Success is a 1984 Soviet drama film directed by Konstantin Khudyakov.

Plot 
The film tells about a cruel director who goes to a peripheral theater to stage The Seagull. He is obsessed and very passionate and gains success. But the price of this success is too expensive.

Cast 
 Leonid Filatov as Gennadi Fetisov
 Alisa Freindlich as Zinaida Nikolayevna Arsenyeva
 Aleksandr Zbruyev as Oleg Zuyev
 Lev Durov as Pavlik Platonov
 Larisa Udovichenko as Alla Saburova
 Anatoliy Romashin as Nikolai Knyazev
 Lyudmila Saveleva as Inna (as L. Saveleva)
 Alla Meshcheryakova as Nyusya (as A. Meshcheryakova)
 Marina Politseymako as Galya (as M. Politseymako)
 Vatslav Dvorzhetsky as Vinokurov (as V. Dvorzhetsky)

References

External links 
 

1984 films
1980s Russian-language films
Soviet drama films
1984 drama films